XEQ-FM is a radio station in Mexico City. Broadcasting on 92.9 FM, XEQ-FM broadcasts grupera music under the name "La Ke Buena" and is the flagship of a network of stations with the same branding and format. The programming on XEQ-FM is also simulcast on Mexico City AM radio station 940 XEQ-AM.

History
The original concession for XEQ-FM was awarded on April 16, 1957 to Radio Mexicana del Centro, S.A. de C.V.

In 1978, XEQ-FM became the first tropical music station in Mexico City under the name "Tropi Q"; others later followed. The format moved to AM in 1993, when XEQ-FM picked up its current name and format of grupera music. The grupera format had previously been on XEX-AM, where it was known as "La Super X".

Until 2019, the station was known as Ke Buena but carried a tropical version of the format, instead of the typical grupera version. On October 31, 2019, this ended and XEQ-AM began simulcasting XEQ-FM.

On November 7, 2022, Monterrey's XHCHL-FM also adopted the Ke Buena format, relaying most of XEQ's programming but with local advertising.

References

Radio stations established in 1957
Radio stations in Mexico City
1957 establishments in Mexico